The 1919 Tie Cup was the 20° and last edition of this competition. It was contested by the champions of Copa de Competencia Jockey Club (Argentina) and Copa de Competencia (Uruguay).

Boca Juniors beat Nacional) at Estadio Sportivo Barracas, that hosted most international matches during that decade. The final was scheduled for May 1920.

Qualified teams

Overview 

With only 15 minutes played, Boca Juniors midfielder Mario Buzzo injured so he left the field. Despite playing with ten players most of the match (substitutions were not allowed by those times) the Argentine side scored its first goal on 32 minutes after an aerial passing by winger Pedro Calomino that goalkeeper Andrés Mazali could not intercept well, allowing Pedro Miranda to head the ball.

In the second half, Uruguayan defender Alfredo Foglino was injured after a collision so both teams played the rest of the match with 10 men each. Boca Juniors' second goal was scored by Pablo Bozzo after heading the ball by a pass from Calomino, regarded as the man of the match.

Match details 

Notes

References

t
t
1919 in Argentine football
1919 in Uruguayan football
Football in Buenos Aires